Myanmar–Thailand relations refers to the current and historical relations between Myanmar (also known as Burma) and Thailand. Myanmar has an embassy in Bangkok. Thailand has an embassy in Yangon. Relations between Burma and Thailand focus mainly on economic issues and trade. There is sporadic conflict with Thailand over three disputed islands.

Military history

Burmese–Siamese War (1547-1549)

The Burmese–Siamese war of 1548 was the first of many wars fought between the Burmese of Pegu and the Siamese of Ayutthaya. The war began with an invasion by King Tabinshwehti of the Taungoo Dynasty through the Three Pagodas Pass into Siamese territory, which presaged an attack on the capital city of Ayutthaya itself. The invasion came after a political crisis in Ayutthaya that had ended with the placing of Maha Chakkraphat on the Siamese thrones

The war is notable for the introduction of early modern warfare by Portuguese mercenaries. It is most notable in the history of Thailand for the valiant death in battle of Siamese Queen Suriyothai on her war elephant. As a result, the conflict is often referred to in Thailand as the War that led to the loss of Queen Suriyothai.

Burmese–Siamese War (1594–1605)

The Burmese–Siamese War (1594–1605) was the war caused by the vengeance of Siam towards the Burmese rule. King Naresuan of Ayutthaya was planning to conquer Burma. The war began with Siamese attacks on and occupation of the cities of Tenasserim and Myeik, then proceeded to Toungoo.

Burmese–Siamese War (1765–1767)

The Burmese–Siamese War (1765–1767) was the second military conflict between the Konbaung Dynasty of Burma and the Ban Phlu Luang Dynasty of Siam (Thailand), and the war that ended the four-century-old Siamese kingdom. Nonetheless, the Burmese were soon forced to give up their hard-won gains when the Chinese invasions of their homeland forced a complete withdrawal by the end of 1767. A new Siamese dynasty, to which the current Thai monarchy traces its origin, emerged to reunify Siam by 1770.

This war was the continuation of the war of 1759–1760. The casus belli of this war were also the control of the Tenasserim coast and its trade, and the Siamese support for the rebels in the Burmese border regions. The war began in August 1765 when a 20,000-strong northern Burmese army invaded northern Siam, and was joined in by three southern armies of over 20,000 in October, in a pincer movement on Ayutthaya. By late January 1766, the Burmese armies had overcome numerically superior but poorly coordinated Siamese defences, and converged before the Siamese capital.

The siege of Ayutthaya began during the first Chinese invasion of Burma. The Siamese believed that if they could hold out until the rainy season, the seasonal flooding of the Ayutthayan central plain would force a retreat. But King Hsinbyushin of Burma believed that the Chinese war was a minor border dispute, and decided to continue the siege. During the rainy season of 1766 (June–October), the battle moved to the waters of the flooded plain but failed to change the status quo. When the dry season came, the Chinese launched a much larger invasion but Hsinbyushin still refused to recall the troops. In March 1767, King Ekkathat of Siam offered to become a tributary but the Burmese demanded an unconditional surrender. On 7 April 1767, the Burmese sacked the starving city for the second time in history, committing atrocities that have left a major black mark on Burmese-Thai relations to the present day. Thousands of Siamese captives were relocated to Burma.

The Burmese occupation was short-lived. In November 1767, the Chinese again invaded with their largest force yet, finally convincing Hsinbyushin to withdraw his forces from Siam. In the ensuing Siamese civil war, Taksin's Thonburi forces emerged the sole winner by mid-1770. The Burmese had also defeated a fourth Chinese invasion by December 1769.

By then, a new stalemate had taken hold. Burma had annexed the lower Tenasserim coast but again failed to eliminate Siam as the sponsor of rebellions in her eastern and southern borderlands. In the following years, Hsinbyushin was preoccupied by the Chinese threat, and did not renew the Siamese war until 1775—only after Lan Na had revolted again with Siamese support. The post-Ayutthaya Siamese leadership proved more than capable; they defeated the next two invasions (1775–1776 and 1785–1786), and annexed Lan Na in the process.

Burmese–Siamese War (1785–1786)

Bodawpaya of Burma pursued his ambitious campaigns to expand his dominions. The Burmese-Siamese War (1785–1786) was called “Nine Armies War” by Siam because the Burmese came in nine armies. The armies surged into Lan na and Northern Siam, yet the governor of Lampang managed to partly halt the Burmese, waiting for the troops from Bangkok. As Phitsanulok was captured, Rama I himself led an army to the north.

In the south, Bodawpaya was waiting at Three Pagodas Pass. The Front Palace led his troops to the south the counter-attacked the Burmese came from Ranong through Nakhon Si Thammarat and the engagements occurred at Kanchanaburi. The Burmese also attacked Thalang (Phuket), where to governor had just died. Chan, wife of the governor, and her sister Mook gathered people to defend Thalang against the Burmese. Today, Chan and Mook are revered as two heroines opposing the Burmese invasions.

The Burmese proceeded to capture Songkhla. Upon hearing the news, the governors of Phatthalung fled. However, a monk named Phra Maha encouraged the citizens to turn up their arms against the Burmese. Phra Maha was later raised to nobility by Rama I.

As his armies were destroyed, Bodawpaya retreated, only to renew attacks the next year (1786). Bodawpaya, this time, didn't divide his troops but instead formed into single army. Bodawpaya passed through the Chedi Sam Ong and settled in Ta Din Dang. The Front Palace marched the Siamese forces to face Bodawpaya. The fighting was very short and Bodawpaya was quickly defeated. This short war was called “Ta Din Dang campaign”.

19th century relations 
In the 19th century, Burma became a colony of the British Empire. This prevented any Burmo - Siamese conflict.

20th century relations

World War II
In 1942, Thailand sent the Phayap Army to occupy the Shan State and Kayah State of Burma. The principal objective of the army commander was to procure opium.
Diplomatic relations were established in 1948.

21st century relations 
Recently, Prime Minister Abhisit Vejjajiva made clear that dialogue encouraging political change is a priority for Thailand, but not through economic sanctions. He also made clear to reconstruct temples damaged in the aftermath of Cyclone Nargis. However, there were tensions over detained opposition leader Aung San Suu Kyi, with Thailand calling for her release. She was released in 2010.

Disputed territory
, sovereignty over three Andaman Sea islands remains disputed. The standing agreement, negotiated in February 1982, left undetermined the status of Ginga Island (Ko Lam), Ko Kham, and Ko Ki Nok at the mouth of the Kraburi River (Pakchan River). Subsequent negotiations in 1985, 1989, and 1990 made no progress. The two parties have designated the islands as "no man's land". Ongoing tensions in the area resulted in minor clashes in 1998, 2001, 2003, and 2013.

2010 Burma Border clashes

The 2010 Burma border clashes were a series of ongoing skirmishes between the Myanmar Armed Forces (Tatmadaw) and splinter brigades of the Democratic Karen Buddhist Army (DKBA). The clashes erupted along the border with Thailand shortly after the general election on 7 November 2010. An estimated 10,000 refugees have fled into nearby neighbouring Thailand to escape the violent conflict. There is concern that due to discontent with the elections, and speculations of electoral fraud, that the conflict could escalate into a civil war.

Modern political history

Present political relations
In 2018, Senior General Min Aung Hlaing received the Knight Grand Cross First Class of the Most Exalted Order of the White Elephant, after being nominated by King Maha Vajiralongkorn.

2021 unrests in Thailand and Myanmar
Both Thailand and Myanmar have been in chaos due to protests (2020–2021 Thai protests and 2021 Myanmar protests) against the military juntas in both countries; there has been solidarity between Thai and Burmese protesters. However, while Thai protests, despite its significance, is mostly peaceful, the Burmese protests were met with brutal repression. The Thai government, led by a former General himself, is accused of helping the Tatmadaw to maintain power in Myanmar, which was denied. At the same time, Burmese refugees have been flowing to Thailand, creating a border crisis and fear of COVID-19 spikes, in which the Thai government was also accused of trying to drive the refugees away, despite having guaranteed not to turn away the refugees.

See also
 Burmese–Siamese wars
 Foreign relations of Thailand
 Foreign relations of Burma
 History of Thailand
 History of Burma
 Myanmar–Thailand border

References

Further reading
 
 International Boundary Study No. 63 – February 1, 1966 Burma – Thailand Boundary

 
Thailand
Bilateral relations of Thailand